The Nation's Future Party, also known as the Future of the Nation Party or Mostaqbal Watan, is an Egyptian political party. Originally a minor party, it has grown to become Egypt's largest political party and currently controls the majority of seats in the House of Representatives and a plurality of seats in the Senate. The party is often seen as a "party of power", created for the sole purpose of backing President Abdel Fattah el-Sisi and his policies.

History

Nation's Future Party was set up in mid-2014 by the Egyptian Military Intelligence. Former member of Abdel Fattah el-Sisi's presidential campaign Abdel Azim told Mada Masr:  A student responsible for Nation's Future Party campaigning in his governorate was interviewed by Mada Masr. For each street march,  to  would be delivered, and young men organised by government agencies would be paid  each to participate in the marches. Instead of being run by volunteers, the campaign office was staffed by civil servants. Party leader Mohamed Badran took his instructions, according to the interviewee, from Major Ahmed Shaaban of Military Intelligence.

2015 parliamentary election 

The Future of the Nation Party ran in the 2015 parliamentary elections as part of the "For the Love of Egypt" electoral alliance, which won all 120 party seats in the parliament. It was subsequently allocated 53 seats in parliament, making it the second-largest party after the Free Egyptians Party that won 65 seats, and ahead of the New Wafd Party, Egypt's oldest political party.

2018 presidential election 

In 2018, after all political parties, except for the Ghad Party led by Moussa Mostafa Moussa, failed to field candidates for the presidential election in March that year, calls to merge Egypt's 104 political parties into four or five strong parties increased. In response, efforts to strengthen the presence of powerful parties in the Egyptian political scene, primarily led by the Free Egyptians Party, the Nation's Future Party, and the New Wafd Party—as well as the Support Egypt Coalition, which holds 400 out of 597 seats in the Egyptian parliament—began.

2020 parliamentary election 

In the 2020 Egyptian parliamentary election, the Nation's Future Party grew significantly and won a majority of seats in the House of Representatives and a plurality in the Senate.

Policies

The Egyptian Armed Forces
The party has always supported the Egyptian Armed Forces, believing Egyptians need to unite behind the Army and the Police Force in their fight against terrorism in defence of the nation. It is firmly opposed to the deployment of Egyptian troops in Syria, asserting that the Egyptian Armed Forces should only protect Egypt and that it is not in Egypt's interest to get involved in the armed conflict in Syria.

Economic reforms
The Future of the Nation Party has always supported the President in regards to economic reforms. They supported the subsidy cuts on fuel, electricity and water, and are strong supporters of the New Investment Law and the liberalization of the Egyptian Pound.

Party leaders have often stated their support for the IMF-backed economic reform program, believing it is the only way to help Egypt recover from the effects of the 2011 Revolution and to create a modern, powerful Egyptian state despite the resulting hardships.

Foreign affairs
The party's foreign affairs position tends to revolve around the concept that Egypt plays a pivotal role in the region and is a powerful state in an otherwise uncertain part of the world. As such, the party strongly supports diplomacy with as many nations as possible, especially in the fight against terrorism.

The party has often shown support for other Arab states, particularly those within the GCC. Considering Egypt's military strength and the warm relations enjoyed with Saudi Arabia and the UAE, the party has supported calls to protect the Gulf states from foreign interference, particularly from Iran. It also believes in the importance of the state's efforts to conclude the conflicts in Syria and Libya, and to reach a peaceful solution to the Israeli–Palestinian conflict.

Reaching out to African states has also been a priority. The party has regularly lobbied the government to improve relations with the African continent, which were arguably non-existent for the latter part of the Mubarak era. The party regularly sends diplomatic delegations to foreign countries in preparation for state visits by the President of Egypt.

References

2014 establishments in Egypt
Egyptian nationalist parties
Political parties established in 2014
Political parties in Egypt
Political parties with year of establishment missing
Populist parties
Ruling party